Bilici may refer to:

 Bilici Qorqan, village in the municipality of Qorqan in the Davachi Rayon of Azerbaijan
 Dağ Bilici, village and municipality in the Davachi Rayon of Azerbaijan
 Düz Bilici, village and municipality in the Davachi Rayon of Azerbaijan
 Bilići (disambiguation)

Turkish-language surnames